A statutory employee is an independent contractor under American common law who is treated as an employee, by statute, for purposes of tax withholdings. For a standard independent contractor, an employer cannot withhold taxes. Statutory employees are also permitted to deduct work-related expenses on IRS Schedule C instead of Schedule A in the United States tax system. As a result, they are allowed a greater tax deduction for business expenses than standard employees, as Schedule C expenses are not subject to the 2% adjusted gross income threshold as seen with Schedule A.

Criteria
For an individual to be considered a statutory employee, all of the following conditions must apply:

Some examples of persons who may be considered statutory employees are as follows:

Advantages over standard employee
Statutory employees occupy an intermediate position between employees and independent contractors from the perspective of the employer. Statutory employees are less expensive to hire than regular employees because the employer does not have to pay unemployment taxes. However, such employees are more expensive to hire than independent contractors because Social Security and Medicare taxes must be paid on wages in the form of FICA tax. Statutory employees pay FICA tax through their employer, and so do not pay self-employment tax; despite this, they must report expenses, income and wage.

Similar to independent contractors, statutory employees may deduct business expense from W-2 earnings.

See also

References

Further reading

Publication 17 Your Federal Income Tax
Form 1040 series of forms and instructions
Social Security's booklet "Medicare Premiums: Rules for Higher-Income Beneficiaries" and the calculation of the Social Security MAGI.

Agency law
United States business law
Employment classifications
Recruitment
Taxation in the United States
Fiscal policy